The Ambassador of the United Kingdom to Eritrea is the United Kingdom's foremost diplomatic representative in the State of Eritrea, and head of the UK's diplomatic mission in Asmara.  The official title is His Britannic Majesty's Ambassador to the State of Eritrea.

From Eritrean independence in 1993 until March 2002 the British Ambassador to Ethiopia, resident in Addis Ababa, was also accredited to Eritrea.

The current ambassador is Alisdair Walker.

List of heads of mission

Ambassadors to Eritrea
1997–2000: Gordon Wetherell
2000–2002: Myles Wickstead
2002–2006: Michael Murray
2006–2008: Nick Astbury
2008–2010: Andrea Reidy
2010–2012: Sandra Tyler-Haywood
2012–2014: Amanda Tanfield
2014–2016: David Ward
2016–2019: Ian Richards

2019–: Alisdair Walker

References

External links
UK and Eritrea, gov.uk

Eritrea
 
United Kingdom